The Gaoshan Han are a subgroup of the Han Chinese located in Yunnan and Guizhou provinces such as in Rongjiang County of Guizhou. The culture of the Gaoshan Han is strikingly different from mainstream Han culture as they mix culture with Miao and Dong population.(400,000)

References

Subgroups of the Han Chinese
Ethnic groups in Yunnan
Culture in Guizhou
Ethnic groups in China